Beatrice Harrison (9 December 1892 – 10 March 1965) was a British cellist active in the first half of the 20th century. She gave first performances of several important English works, especially those of Frederick Delius, and made the first or standard recordings of others, particularly the first recording of Elgar’s cello concerto in 1920 with the composer conducting.

Biography

Early training
Beatrice Harrison was born in Roorkee, North-West India. The Harrison family moved back to England during her childhood and she studied at the Royal College of Music, London, and afterwards under Hugo Becker, and at the High School of Music in Berlin. In 1910 she won the Mendelssohn Prize, and made her debut in the Bechstein Hall, Berlin.

A musical family
Beatrice was the sister of May Harrison, violinist, a student of Leopold Auer; Margaret Harrison, a pianist, but perhaps better known as a breeder of Irish Wolfhounds and a dog show judge; and the  mezzo-soprano Monica Harrison. Like the family of Mark Hambourg, this was one in which the children were taught separate instruments so that they could play in ensemble. May had once stood in for Fritz Kreisler in a Mendelssohn concert in Helsingfors (now Helsinki). Both May and Beatrice won the Gold Medal of the Associated Board for violin and cello respectively.

Hugo Becker had spoken to Sir Henry Wood of his admiration for Beatrice Harrison's playing even before her debut under his baton in 1911, playing Dvorak, Haydn and Tchaikovsky. Wood, Charles Villiers Stanford and Edward Elgar were all great admirers. Stanford's Ballata and Ballabile, op 160, was written for Harrison and first heard on 3 May 1919 at The Wigmore Hall, using a piano reduction.

The Harrison family became friends with Roger Quilter and his circle through the Soldiers' concerts in 1916. On 11 March 1918 Beatrice performed Dvořák's Cello Concerto in B minor with the Royal Philharmonic Orchestra under Thomas Beecham.

First performances of the Delius repertoire
Beatrice attracted wider attention as the first performer of Delius's Cello Sonata (Wigmore Hall, 31 Oct 1918). And on 11 November, May gave the first performance of the Delius Violin Sonata No. 1, which she later recorded with Arnold Bax at the piano. Roger Quilter attended both performances, for they were also playing his music in concerts at that time. The Violin Concerto, written at Grez-sur-Loing in 1919, had its first performance at Queen's Hall with Albert Sammons (the dedicatee) under Adrian Boult in the same year. Beatrice and her sister gave the first performance of Delius's Double Concerto (which he had completed in 1915 and dedicated to them) in his presence at a Queen's Hall Symphony Concert in January 1920. After this Delius returned to Grez and, at Beatrice Harrison's request, began work on his Cello Concerto. She performed the Cello Sonata at a concert in Paris on 8 June. After two months' uninterrupted work in his Hampstead flat, Delius finished the concerto in the spring of 1921, and it was performed by the cellist whom Sir Thomas Beecham called 'this talented lady.' When Delius's remains were re-buried according to his wishes in a southern English country churchyard, on 24 May 1935, the village chosen was Limpsfield near the Harrison home at Oxted in Surrey: Beatrice Harrison played after the service, at which Thomas Beecham gave the oration.

The Elgar concerto

Harrison gave the first festival performance of Edward Elgar's Cello Concerto outside London, at the Three Choirs Festival in Hereford in 1921. By 1924 she had toured in Europe and America, and in November 1925 she reappeared at the Royal Philharmonic in the all-Elgar concert, performing the Cello Concerto under Elgar's baton (he had insisted that she be the soloist whenever he conducted the work, after she studied the work with him prior to making an abridged, pre-electric recording). This was the occasion upon which the Gold Medal was awarded to Sir Edward by Henry Wood on behalf of the Society. A year or two later, when the advent of electrical recording had improved the technical potential of the gramophone, Beatrice Harrison was the soloist chosen to make the 'official' HMV recording of the concerto with Elgar conducting.

In 1929 at the Harrogate festival she was a contributor at a festival concert of works associated with the Frankfurt Group (Quilter and colleagues), and in 1933 Quilter re-arranged his 'L'Amour de moy' for her for a broadcast.

'... a nightingale singing along with her'
Harrison's performances became well known through broadcast in the early days of BBC sound radio. She made one of the BBC's earliest live outside broadcasts in May 1924 when she sat and played her cello in the garden of her house Foyle Riding  at Oxted, duetting with nightingales. 'A few years later, recordings of Beatrice Harrison with the nightingales were made by HMV [‘His Master’s Voice’, also known as ‘the Gramophone Company’]. These were made available on the standard 10-inch shellac gramophone discs, and proved extremely popular.' These recordings were made on 3 May 1927 with a further session on 9 May 1927. The first published recordings were put on sale in June 1927 and included the Northern Irish folk song, Londonderry Air (the tune of Danny Boy) coupled with Chant Hindu from the opera Sadko (Rimsky-Korsakov) issued on HMV B2470, together with a recording of singing nightingales coupled with a soundscape titled 'Dawn in an Old World Garden' issued on HMV B 2469.  A further recording made at the same time, Songs my mother taught me (Dvořák), which was coupled with another soundscape recording, was issued on HMV B2853 and put on sale in November 1928. Records were also issued of the nightingales singing alone and of the dawn chorus from Harrison's garden.

The BBC had no viable means of recording sound until 1930. In April 2022 the BBC used one of the His Master's Voice recordings of 1927 believing it to be their own recording of the 1924 broadcast. They compounded this error by admitting that the duets had been faked with the use of a voice artist who they suggested could be the variety performer Maude Gould. Although this claim has been widely reported no documentary evidence has been produced to verify the BBC's statement that the 1924 broadcast was a fake.

Wartime again

Perhaps inevitably the Elgar Concerto was the work with which she was most closely identified, not least in her performances for Henry Wood. There was a very successful performance in August 1937, and another at the Elgar Concert of 27 August 1940, with the London Symphony Orchestra, in the old Queen's Hall, less than a year before it was destroyed by German bombing. On this occasion the soloist's style was particularly animated, causing her ringlets to 'dance' in such a way that the orchestral players were distracted. During the concert, there was a rattle of gunfire outside and plaster fell inside the hall. Sir Henry considered her performance the finest he had ever directed. She was one of the English soloists who took part in Wood's very final season in July 1944, a month before his death.

Beatrice Harrison owned and played a cello made by Pietro Guarneri (Pietro da Venezia) (1695–1762).

She died in Surrey in 1965.  She is buried in the churchyard of St Peter's, Limpsfield, near Sir Thomas Beecham and other prominent musicians.

Centenary Concert
On 9 December 1992 at Wigmore Hall the Beatrice Harrison Centenary Concert was given by cellist Julian Lloyd Webber and pianist John Lenehan. The programme consisted of works especially associated with the cellist including the Cello Sonata by John Ireland (which she premiered in April 1924), and the Delius Sonata, as well as "Pastoral and Reel" by Cyril Scott, which Lloyd Webber played with Harrison's sister, Margaret, on the piano.

Recordings
(Not a complete list)
Elgar: Cello concerto (New Symphony Orchestra cond. by Edward Elgar) HMV D1507-9 (3 records, 1928)
Delius: Cello Sonata (w. Harold Craxton, pno) HMV D1103-4 (2 records).
Delius: Elegie, and Caprice (Orchestra cond. by Eric Fenby) HMV B3721 (1 record).
Delius: Entr'acte and Serenade from Hassan Incidental Music (w. Margaret Harrison, pno). HMV B3274 (1 record).
Nightingales/Londonderry Air/Chant Hindu HMV B2470 10"
Dawn in an old world garden/Nightingales HMV B2469 10"
Nightingales/Songs my mother taught me etc. HMV B2853 102

Beatrice Harrison in literature
Beatrice Harrison's performances with nightingales formed the subject of a poem 'The Nightingale Broadcasts' by Robert Saxton which won the 2001 Prize of the Keats-Shelley Memorial Association.
Her nightingale recordings were the inspiration for a 2004 play by Patricia Cleveland Peck, The Cello and the Nightingale
Beatrice Harrison's performances with nightingales are referred to as a dramatic device in order to introduce an episode with nightingales in John Preston's 2007 novel The Dig.

Sources
T. Beecham, Frederick Delius (Hutchinson & Co, London 1959).
R.T. Darrell, The Gramophone Shop Encyclopedia of Recorded Music (New York 1936).
Arthur Eaglefield Hull (Ed.), A Dictionary of Modern Music and Musicians (Dent, London 1924).
R. Elkin, Royal Philharmonic, The Annals of the Royal Philharmonic Society (Rider & Co, London 1946).
V. Langfield, Roger Quilter, His Life and Music (Woodbridge, Boydell 2002).
R. Pound, Sir Henry Wood (Cassell, London 1969).
H. Wood, My Life of Music (Gollancz, London 1938).
Beatrice Harrison, The Cello and the Nightingales.  The Autobiography of Beatrice Harrison, Edited by Patricia Cleveland-Peck.  Foreword by Julian Lloyd Webber. (John Murray, London 1985).
The Harrison Sisters Issue, The Delius Society Journal, Autumn 1985, Number 87.

References

External links

BBC recordings of Beatrice Harrison and birds
Review of Beatrice Harrison's Centenary Concert
A 2015 article by Iain Logie Baird introducing much new research about the nightingale broadcasts and the microphone used.
Candlin, David. "Beatrice Harrison and her duets with Nightingales." Limpsfield, United Kingdom: St. Peter's Limpsfield Parish News, Autumn 2015, p. 16.

1892 births
1965 deaths
English classical cellists
Alumni of the Royal College of Music
Mendelssohn Prize winners
People from Oxted
20th-century classical musicians
20th-century English musicians
Women cellists
20th-century English women musicians
British people in colonial India
20th-century cellists